Transfusion-dependent anemia is a form of anemia characterized by the need for continuous blood transfusion. It is a condition that results from various diseases, and is associated with decreased survival rates. Regular transfusion is required to reduce the symptoms of anemia by increasing functional red blood cells and hemoglobin count. Symptoms may vary based on the severity of the condition and the most common symptom is fatigue.
Various diseases can lead to transfusion-dependent anemia, most notably myelodysplastic syndromes (MDS) and thalassemia. Due to the number of diseases that can cause transfusion-dependent anemia, diagnosing it is more complicated. Transfusion dependence occurs when an average of more than 2 units of blood transfused every 28 days is required over a period of at least 3 months. Myelodysplastic syndromes is often only diagnosed when patients become anemic, and transfusion-dependent thalassemia is diagnosed based on gene mutations. Screening for heterozygosity in the thalassemia gene is an option for early detection.

The transfusions itself alleviates the symptoms of anemia, and are used to treat the disease that causes transfusion dependence. The recommended restrictive threshold for blood transfusion is a hemoglobin level of 7 to 8 g/dL, while a more liberal threshold is set at 9 to 10 g/dL. However, more evidence may be required to establish a consensus on the threshold and a personalized approach may be more useful. The main complication of transfusion dependence is iron overloading, which can damage the liver, heart, bone tissue and endocrine glands. Iron chelation therapy is used to treat iron overload and common iron chelators used are deferoxamine, deferiprone and deferasirox. Due to the complications of transfusions dependency, it may be more ideal to directly treat the cause of anemia if possible. However this might not be suitable for all patients, and some may still rely on frequent blood transfusions for survival. While transfusion-dependent anemia has a poor prognosis, advancement in iron chelation therapy may help increase survival rates.

Signs and symptoms 
See more: Anemia

When transfusion dependent patients do not receive their transfusion, symptoms of anemia may arise. The most common symptom that patients experience is fatigue, and other symptoms include shortness of breath, dizziness and heart palpitations. Symptoms may vary depending on the severity of the disease. The use of blood transfusions can ease some of these symptoms by replenishing the blood cells and maintain sufficient hemoglobin levels, however, the goal to improve the overall oxygen-carrying capacity has conflicting results.

Causes 
There are numerous causes for transfusion dependent anemia, typically due to diseases affecting the blood.

Thalassemia

Alpha-thalassemia 
Hemoglobin Barts hydrops fetalis is the most severe form of alpha-thalassemia, and individuals with this disease have severe anemia during the fetal stage of development. It has been considered as fatal until advances in treatment were made. Patients that survive hemoglobin Barts hydrops fetalis will become transfusion dependent.

Beta-thalassemia 
Bata-thalassemia causes decreased functional hemoglobin production, and blood transfusions can be given to maintain a sufficient hemoglobin level. Patients with beta thalassemia major are more affected and are recommended to receive transfusion throughout their lives.

Myelodysplastic syndromes (MDS) 
Myelodysplastic syndromes are disorders where defective blood cells are produced by an abnormal bone marrow, resulting in anemia. Severe cases may require ongoing transfusions, and around 70% of people with myelodysplastic syndromes become transfusion dependent at some point. Patients who are initially considered to be lower-risk may experience disease progression as a result of becoming dependent on blood transfusion when they become increasingly unresponsive to alternative treatments.

Diagnosis 
Diagnosis of transfusion dependent anemia is challenging because this anemia is caused by multiple diseases. Therefore, other than diagnosing anemias that require transfusion, diagnosis for the two main causes (beta-thalassemia and myelodysplastic syndromes) of transfusion dependent anemia is also important.

Transfusion dependent anemia 
Diagnosis of transfusion-dependent anemia is similar to the diagnosis of all other kinds of anemia, which primarily depends on one's complete blood count. Units of red blood cells required is examined to diagnose transfusion dependent anemia. Patients that need more than 2 units of red blood cells every 28 days are considered transfusion dependent. Diagnosed patients require frequent and regular transfusion for survival.

Myelodysplastic syndromes (MDS) 
As 70% of myelodysplastic syndrome patients exhibit transfusion dependent anemia, diagnosis of MDS can also help indicate transfusion dependency. Diagnosis of it is complexed with great diversity of symptoms, and therefore most patients are only diagnosed with myelodysplastic syndromes when seeking clinical advice after experiencing symptoms of anemia.

Beta-thalassemia 
Beta-thalassemia is a genetic disease mostly caused by beta-globin gene mutations. Clinical diagnosis is based on interpretation of the peripheral blood smear, which examines red blood cell morphology, followed by hemoglobin analysis and confirmed by DNA sequencing. DNA analysis is performed by either mutation-specific detection or genome scanning. Different mutation patterns observed from DNA analysis divide thalassemia patients into three classes: thalassemia major (TM), thalassemia intermedia (TI) and thalassemia minor (TI). Another classification was established in 2012 for easier referral of patients that require frequent transfusion for survival, dividing patients into non–transfusion-dependent thalassemia (NTDT) and transfusion-dependent thalassemia (TDT) by their baseline hemoglobin levels. Thalassemia major is usually manifested in fetus and early life (birth to <2 years old) and all patients are transfusion-dependent from birth in order to survive. Anemia experienced by some thalassemia intermedia patients are also regarded transfusion dependent. Therefore, most transfusion-dependent thalassemia patients can be diagnosed within the first few years of life, which severe anemia, differed growth, jaundice and hepatosplenomegaly can be observed. Parameters for confirmation includes baseline hemoglobin level <7g/dL, enlargement of liver and spleen (>5 cm) and height in the first 10th percentile.

Screening

Thalassemia 
Screening programs are available to identify thalassemia patients among the general public. Couples are in particular the target group of screening for early identification of carriers who bear risks of having children with thalassemia. Screenings targeted at them are done by detecting heterozygotes in the thalassemia gene. Whereas screening of fetus is done by one-tube osmotic fragility test (identification of red blood cells resistance to hemolysis), red blood cell tests (measurement of mean corpuscular volume and mean corpuscular haemoglobin) or dischlorophenol indophenol precipitation tests (detection of mutation).

Treatment 
The primary method to treat transfusion-dependent anemia is by transfusing packed red blood cells. Transfusion is also one of the treatment strategies for beta-thalassemia patients and patients with myelodysplastic syndrome (MDS). Although transfusion of red blood cells cannot correct the underlying problems, it can improve anemia conditions.

Side effects of treatment 
There are considerable side effects associated with the transfusion of red blood cells. Side effects include iron overloading, allergic reactions that lead to skin rashes and infections transmitted through transfusion.

The most common side effect is iron overloading, which the severity of overload depends on the frequency, volume, and the amount of blood transfused to the patient. Approximately, 200 to 250 mg of iron is transfused per unit of blood. Iron overloading is resulted because human body cannot excrete excess iron from frequent transfusions, leading to accumulation of iron in blood. Iron in blood causes damage to important organs, such as the heart, liver, bone tissue and endocrine glands. Damage to vital organs leads to morbidities, including cardiovascular diseases and heart failure. The liver is normally involved in iron metabolism and storage and excess iron causes liver diseases, fibrosis and cirrhosis. Complications associated with the endocrine hormones may also occur, including diabetes. The risk of developing transfusion dependency related morbidities increases with patients' ages.

Treatment to reduce iron overloading 
To reduce iron overloading in blood, iron chelation therapy is commonly used together with transfusion. Necessity to initiate iron chelation therapy is determined by blood test and transfusion volume.  Generally, blood with serum ferritin level that exceed 1000 ug/L and a transfusion of 20 units of red blood cells will require iron chelation therapy along with transfusion.

There are three common iron chelators, including deferoxamine, deferiprone and deferasirox.

Deferoxamine 
Deferoxamine is injected into the body through the veins and is the most traditional chelation therapy available. This therapy, although effective, especially for patients with heavy iron overload, is considered very inconvenient. The injection has to be performed over a duration of 8 hours, 5–7 times every week. Therefore, low compliance of patients is one of the major concerns of this therapy. Side effects include abnormal growth of bones and kidney damages. Deferoxamine is seldom used alone nowadays, but rather in combination with oral deferiprone to increase the effectiveness in reducing iron overload.

Deferiprone 
Deferiprone is an oral drug that is ingested by patients three times a day. Although patients are still required to visit the clinic frequently for complete blood count, the administering process by simply oral intake regularly is still less tedious when compared to deferoxamine. It is also effective in reducing cardiac-related diseases due to iron overloading. Major side effects of this drug are to the gastrointestinal system.

Defasirox 
Defasirox is also an oral drug to mitigate iron overloading taken one dose per day by patients. It shares similar benefits of convenience with deferiprone when compared to deferoxamine, but however is of the highest cost. Side effects to the gastrointestinal and urinary system are common.

The use of iron chelation therapy is not without concern. It can also cause skeletal changes that leads to bone disorders such as osteoporosis. Therefore, minimizing the need of transfusion when possible is still the best way in reducing iron overload.

Other than physical side effects brought by transfusion, transfusion also poses stress psychologically and financially. Inconvenience brought by frequent transfusion interferes with the normal social lives of patients. As a result, lack of social ties make patients more vulnerable to psychiatric illnesses like depression. The high cost for repeated transfusion can also cause financial burden on the patient and his/her family. Subjection to physical, psychological and financial stresses brought by frequent transfusions and its related morbidities worsen the quality of life of most patients as the disease progresses.

Alternative treatments 
As there are a number of drawbacks brought by frequent transfusions, directly treating the cause of anemia (e.g. myelodysplastic syndrome), if available, remains the optimal choice of treatment. Hematopoietic stem cell transplantation is a treatment for thalassemia that minimizes the need of transfusion in long term. However, it is not suitable for patients with organs that have already experienced certain degree of iron overload, and it may only be applicable to strong and young patients. While for transfusion-dependent myelodysplastic syndrome patients, lenalidomide is approved for treating lower-risk patients and hypomethylating agents can be used to treat higher-risk patients.

Prognosis 
An International Prognostic Scoring System (IPSS) is specially designed to access the prognosis of myelodysplastic syndrome patients. Scores help to classify patients into low, intermediate-1, intermediate-2 and high risks based on their severity levels. Patients in the lower-risk group generally have a longer survival range of 3–8.8 years, comparied to only 0.8–1.6 years for high-risk patients.

In general, the survival rate of transfusion-dependent anemia patients is increasing. This is due to the improvements in transfusion procedures, mature use of iron chelation therapies to reduce iron overloading, and more experiences in dealing with associated morbidities.

References 

Transfusion reactions
Anemias